Hakushima Station (白島駅) is the name of two train stations in Hiroshima, Japan:

 Hakushima Station (Astram Line)
 Hakushima Station (Hiroden)